Mirisah (also Romanized as Mīrīsah; also known as Marīshe, Merīsah, and Meriseh) is a village in Farmeshkhan Rural District, in the Central District of Kavar County, Fars Province, Iran. At the 2006 census, its population was 209, in 52 families.

References 

Populated places in Kavar County